Framing may refer to:
 Framing (construction), common carpentry work
 Framing (law), providing false evidence or testimony to prove someone guilty of a crime
 Framing (social sciences)
 Framing (visual arts), a technique used to bring the focus to the subject
 Framing (World Wide Web), a technique using multiple panes within a web page
 Pitch framing, a baseball concept
 Timber framing, a traditional method of building with heavy timbers

See also
 Frame synchronization, in telecommunications
 Frame of reference, a coordinate system
 Frame (disambiguation)
 Framed (disambiguation)
 Framing device, a narrative tool 
 Framework (disambiguation)
 Inertial frame of reference, describes time and space homogeneously, isotropically, independent of time
 Picture frame
 Verb framing, in linguistics